Siddapur or Siddapura is a village in Kodagu district, Karnataka, in India. It is situated in a coffee growing region near the river Kaveri.

Temples
 Ganapathi temple, shri rama mandira siddapaura 
Ayyappa Temple, Virajpet road
 Gowri Shankara Temple, Old Siddapur
 Sri Chamundeshwari Temple
 shri muttappa bhagavathi temple

Tourism
Siddapura has won the reputation as a tourist destination for those who wish to spend a few days in the middle of a coffee estate.  Orange County resorts have started a property here meant for upmarket international clients.

Education
 Convent School, Virajpet Road.

See also
 Madikeri
 Mangalore
 Virajpet

References

Villages in Kodagu district